Kille is a hamlet in the Dutch province of North Brabant. It is a part of the municipality of Altena, and lies northwest of Nieuwendijk, and about 8 km southwest of Gorinchem.

Kille is not a statistical entity, and the postal authorities have placed it under Nieuwendijk.

It was first mentioned in 1874 as Kille, and means gully. It is reference to the stream Bakkerskil. It has become a single urban area with Nieuwendijk, but still has its own place name signs. Kille was home to 216 people in 1840. Nowadays it consists of about 100 houses.

References

Populated places in North Brabant
Geography of Altena, North Brabant